NBA Showtime is the pregame show aired before each NBA on NBC telecast. The program, a half-hour in length, began during the 1990–91 NBA season, and was initially hosted by Bob Costas. Costas left in the mid-1990s, and became lead play-by-play voice of The NBA on NBC in 1997. Hannah Storm replaced Costas and hosted Showtime until Ahmad Rashad replaced her as host of the pregame show when Storm went on maternity leave in 2001. Storm returned in 2002 which meant that her and Rashad would alternate as hosts throughout the season. NBC kept the title of Showtime prior to the 2000–01 NBA season.

Showtime analysts included:
Quinn Buckner 1991–1993
P. J. Carlesimo 2000–2001
Pat Croce 2001–2002
Julius Erving 1993–1997
Mike Fratello 2001–2002
Kevin Johnson 2000–2001
Pat Riley 1990–1991
John Salley 1997–1998
Isiah Thomas 1998–2000
Tom Tolbert 2002
Peter Vecsey 1990–2001
Jayson Williams 2001–2002

Midway Games created an NBA Showtime arcade game in 1999. The game was an update to the NBA Jam series, and used the same opening music and presentation style as the television show.

Programming change
On March 3, 1991, the Insiders segment was cancelled and replaced by a report of breaking news: a plane had crashed in Security-Widefield, Colorado.  All aboard were killed in a crash that was caused by wind shear.  Because Operation Desert Storm had just ended, Costas emphasized that the story had nothing to do with events in Iraq.

See also
NBA on NBC
NBA Countdown
Showtime (basketball), an era in Los Angeles Lakers history renowned for their fast-break style

NBC original programming
1990 American television series debuts
2002 American television series endings
Basketball on NBC
Showtime
1990s in sports
2000s in sports